3 Musketeers is a direct-to-video action film by The Asylum loosely based on the 1844 novel The Three Musketeers by Alexandre Dumas. The film is directed by Cole McKay and is a mockbuster that was released shortly after the Paul W. S. Anderson film The Three Musketeers. The film was released on DVD and Blu-ray on October 25, 2011.

Unlike other adaptations of The Three Musketeers, this film is a modern take on the original story.

Premise 
Legendary black ops unit, The 3 Musketeers (master strategist Oliver Athos, enigmatic martial arts expert Renee Aramis and wisecracking hacker Isaac Porthos) attempt to save a passenger airplane that gets shot down over North Korea. They barely escape with their lives before Secret Service rookie Alexandra D'Artagnan is sent to investigate a government coup and enlists their help.

Set in the near-future United States, D'Artagnan uncovers a corrupt general and his plans to assassinate the President of the United States. There is a plan to instigate a government coup in order to install a military regime, so D'Artagnan and the three infamous international spies work together to stop the threat.

Cast
Heather Hemmens as Alexandra D'Artagnan
Xin Sarith Wuku (XIN) as Athos
Keith Allan as Porthos
Michele Boyd as Aramis
David Chokachi as Lewis
Darren Thomas as Rockford
Alan Rachins as Treville
Simon Rhee as a Commander
Andy Clemence as President King
Edward DeRuiter as Jenkins

References

External links
 3 Musketeers at The Asylum
 

2011 films
2011 action films
2011 independent films
American action films
2010s English-language films
The Asylum films
Direct-to-video action films
Films based on The Three Musketeers
Films shot in Los Angeles
Films about coups d'état
Films about assassinations
Films set in North Korea
2010s American films